Live in Japan DVD is the DVD of a live concert performed by Stacie Orrico in Tokyo, Japan in late 2003. The DVD was released on November 2, 2004.

Track listing
"Tight"
"Bounce Back"
"Hesitation"
"Instead"
"I Promise"
"Strong Enough"
"Stuck"
"Can't We Be Friends"
"Jazz Interlude"
"Security"
"Genuine"
"Maybe I Won't Look Back"
"(There's Gotta Be) More to Life"
"Dear Friend"
"I Could Be the One"

Bonus videos (Japan version)
 "I Promise"
 "I Could Be the One"

'''Bonus videos (US and Brazilian version)
 "Stuck"
 "More To Life"

Awards

The album was nominated for a Dove Award for Long Form Music Video of the Year at the 37th GMA Dove Awards.

References

Stacie Orrico albums
Live video albums
2004 live albums
2004 video albums
ForeFront Records video albums
ForeFront Records live albums
Virgin Records video albums
Virgin Records live albums
Christian live video albums